The Cambridge School of historiography was a school of thought which approached the study of the British Empire from the imperialist point of view. It emerged especially at the University of Cambridge in the 1960s. John Andrew Gallagher (1919–80) was especially influential, particularly in his article with Ronald Robinson on "The Imperialism of Free Trade".

Leaders of the School include Anil Seal, Gordon Johnson, Richard Gordon, and David A. Washbrook.

Selected works
 Gallagher, John, and Ronald Robinson. "The Imperialism of Free Trade," Economic History Review (August 1953) 6#1 pp 1–15,   in JSTOR
 Gallagher, John. The Decline, Revival and Fall of the British Empire (Cambridge, 1982) excerpt and text search
 Anil Seal, The Emergence of Indian Nationalism: Competition and Collaboration in the Later Nineteenth Century (1971)
 Gordon Johnson, Provincial Politics and Indian Nationalism: Bombay and the Indian National Congress 1880–1915 (2005)
 Rosalind O'Hanlon and David Washbrook, eds. Religious Cultures in Early Modern India: New Perspectives (2011)
 Robinson, Ronald, John Gallagher and Alice Denny. Africa and the Victorians: The Official Mind of Imperialism (1978)

Criticism
Critics have attacked various ideas of the School. In The New Imperial Histories Reader, Stephen Howe has assembled articles by critics who take aim especially at P. J. Marshall, D. K. Fieldhouse, Robinson and Gallagher, and A. G. Hopkins.

Howard Spodek, for example, praises the school's regional and pluralist perspectives but criticizes their reliance on British (rather than Indian) documentation, sloppy use of social science models, downplaying of ideology, and their excessive emphasis on Indian self-seeking and the importance of British imperial initiatives in achieving modernization. He recommends a deeper appreciation of Indian initiatives, and more attention to the emerging importance of public life in many areas of society rather than just a concentration on politics.

See also
Historiography of the British Empire
Theories of New Imperialism
 Cambridge School (intellectual history) which deals with the history of ideas generally and not the Empire

Notes

Further reading
 Ganachari, Aravind. "Studies in Indian Historiography: 'The Cambridge School,'" Indica, March 2010, 47#1, pp 70–93.
 Hyam, Ronald. "The study of imperial and commonwealth history at Cambridge, 1881–1981: Founding fathers and pioneer research students." Journal of Imperial and Commonwealth History 29.3 (2001): 75–103.
 Eugene F. Irschick, "Interpretations of Indian Political Development." Journal of Asian Studies (February 1975), 34(2): 461–72.
 Spodek, Howard. "Pluralist Politics in British India: The Cambridge Cluster of Historians of Modern India," American Historical Review, (June 1979) 84#3 pp 688–707 in JSTOR

Historical schools
History of colonialism